Fred Lees Morgan (June 1878 – 11 May 1941) was a British actor of the silent era.

He was born in Islington, London, England, UK and died at age 62 in London.

Selected filmography
 East Lynne (1913)
 The Harbour Lights (1914)
 The King's Romance (1914)
 Flying from Justice (1915)
 Disraeli (1916)
 The Grit of a Jew (1917)
 Fettered (1919)
 The Beetle (1919)
 The Land of Mystery (1920)
 The Pride of the Fancy (1920)
 The Breed of the Treshams (1920)
 Colonel Newcome (1920)
 Rodney Stone (1921)
 Safety First (1926)

References

External links
 

1878 births
1941 deaths
People from Islington (district)
Male actors from London
English male film actors
English male silent film actors
20th-century English male actors
20th-century British male actors